"The Gigantic Turnip" or "The Enormous Turnip" (literally "small turnip"; ATU 2044, ‘Pulling up the turnip') is a cumulative Russian fairy tale, collected in Arkhangelsk Governorate and published in 1863 by folklore researcher Alexander Afanasyev in his collection Russian Fairy Tales (tale number 89). 

The story has been rewritten and adapted numerous times into other languages (e.g. into Ukrainian by Ivan Franko; into Polish by Julian Tuwim; into Bulgarian by Ran Bosilek).

Plot 

It is a chain tale, in which a grandfather plants a turnip, which grows so large that he cannot pull it up himself. He asks the grandmother for help, and they together still cannot pull it up. Successively their granddaughter and pets are recruited to help, until they finally pull the turnip up together. The specific ordering and set of people and animals varies. However, in the popular Russian version (based on the 1864 adaptation of Konstantin Ushinsky) their order is quite fixed, with rhythm and rhyme: it is the grandfather (dedka), the grandmother (babka), the granddaughter (vnuchka), the female-dog (zhuchka), the female-cat (koshka) and finally only with the help of the female-mouse (myshka) can the giant turnip (repka) be pulled up.

Derivative works 

Several version for children have been penned, including by Konstantin Ushinsky (1864), Vladimir Dal (1870), and Aleksey Nikolayevich Tolstoy (1940).

The fairy tale has had multiple treatments in English. One of the unfinished projects of award-winning illustrator Ezra Jack Keats was a version of "The Giant Turnip"; artwork for the book was published in the 2002 collection Keats's Neighborhood: An Ezra Jack Keats Treasury.

See also 

 The Little Red Hen
 The Turnip

References 
Notes

Footnotes

External links 
 
 The Giant Turnip. A translation of the Russian fairy tale.
 The Enormous Turnip (Retold by Irene Yates)

Fairy tales collected by Alexander Afanasyev
Fictional plants
Russian folklore
ATU 2000-2199